Xhuliano Skuka (born 2 August 1998) is an Albanian professional footballer who plays as a forward for French  club Metz.

Club career
In January 2023, Skuka joined Ligue 2 club Metz from Partizani having agreed a contract until summer 2026.

References

1998 births
Living people
People from Dibër County
People from Dibër (municipality)
Albanian footballers
Association football forwards
Albania international footballers
Kategoria e Parë players
Kategoria Superiore players
Ligue 2 players
KF Korabi Peshkopi players
FK Dinamo Tirana players
FK Partizani Tirana players
FC Metz players
Albanian expatriate footballers
Albanian expatriate sportspeople in France
Expatriate footballers in France